Justice for Selwyn is a 1968 Czech-West German television film directed by Jiří Weiss and starring Rudolf Hrušínský.

Cast
 Rudolf Hrušínský as Unden
 Klaus Schwarzkopf as Selvin
 Jiřina Šejbalová as Selvin's mother
 Míla Myslíková as Irena
 Josef Kemr as Notary
 Věra Tichánková as Witness

References

External links
 

1968 films
Czechoslovak comedy-drama films
1960s Czech-language films
Czech comedy-drama films
1960s Czech films